Principal Holy Days are a type of observance in the Anglican Communion, including the Church of England. All Principal Feasts are also Principal Holy Days.  All Principal Holy Days share equal status; however those which are not Principal Feasts, being fast days within the season of Lent, lack a festal character.  They are considered to be the most significant type of observance, the others being Festivals, Lesser Festivals, and Commemorations. Observance of Principal Holy Days is considered obligatory.

Principal Holy Days (other than Principal Feasts) in the Church of England
Ash Wednesday
Maundy Thursday
Good Friday

See also
List of Anglican Church calendars
Principal Feast
Festival (Anglicanism)
Lesser Festival
Commemoration (observance)

Church of England festivals